The 2017 Canadian Olympic Curling Trials (branded as the 2017 Tim Hortons Roar of the Rings for sponsorship reasons) were held from December 2 to 10 at the Canadian Tire Centre in Kanata, Ottawa, Ontario. The winners of the men's and women's events would represent Canada at the 2018 Winter Olympics.

The women's final was won by Team Rachel Homan in front of her home town crowd. She defeated Team Chelsea Carey 6–5, after Carey missed a pivotal double takeout on her last shot of the 10th end.

The men's final was won by Team Kevin Koe from Alberta. He defeated Team Mike McEwen 7–6, drawing to the button for one on the last stone of the 10th end.

Men

Teams

Round-robin standings
Final round-robin standings

Scores

Draw 1
Saturday, December 2, 2:00pm

Draw 2
Saturday, December 2, 7:00pm

Draw 3
Sunday, December 3, 9:00am

Draw 4
Sunday, December 3, 2:00pm

Draw 5
Sunday, December 3, 7:00pm

Draw 6
Monday, December 4, 9:00am

Draw 7
Monday, December 4, 2:00pm

Draw 8
Monday, December 4, 7:00pm

Draw 9
Tuesday, December 5, 9:00am

Draw 10
Tuesday, December 5, 2:00pm

Draw 11
Tuesday, December 5, 7:00pm

Draw 12
Wednesday, December 6, 9:00am

Draw 13
Wednesday, December 6, 2:00pm

Draw 14
Wednesday, December 6, 7:00pm

Draw 15
Thursday, December 7, 9:00am

Draw 16
Thursday, December 7, 2:00pm

Draw 17
Thursday, December 7, 7:00pm

Draw 18
Friday, December 8, 9:00am

Draw 19
Friday, December 8, 2:00pm

Draw 20
Friday, December 8, 7:00pm

Playoffs

Semifinal
Saturday, December 9, 7:00 pm

Final
Sunday, December 10, 7:00 pm

Player percentages
After round robin play; includes games played at other positions

Women

Teams

Round-robin standings
Final round-robin standings

Scores

Draw 1
Saturday, December 2, 2:00pm

Draw 2
Saturday, December 2, 7:00pm

Draw 3
Sunday, December 3, 9:00am

Draw 4
Sunday, December 3, 2:00pm

Draw 5
Sunday, December 3, 7:00pm

Draw 6
Monday, December 4, 9:00am

Draw 7
Monday, December 4, 2:00pm

Draw 8
Monday, December 4, 7:00pm

Draw 9
Tuesday, December 5, 9:00am

Draw 10
Tuesday, December 5, 2:00pm

Draw 11
Tuesday, December 5, 7:00pm

Draw 12
Wednesday, December 6, 9:00am

Draw 13
Wednesday, December 6, 2:00pm

Draw 14
Wednesday, December 6, 7:00pm

Draw 15
Thursday, December 7, 9:00am

Draw 16
Thursday, December 7, 2:00pm

Draw 17
Thursday, December 7, 7:00pm

Draw 18
Friday, December 8, 9:00am

Draw 19
Friday, December 8, 2:00pm

Draw 20
Friday, December 8, 7:00pm

Playoffs

Semifinal
Saturday, December 9, 2:00 pm

Final
Sunday, December 10, 2:00 pm

Player percentages
After round robin play

Pre-trials
The pre-trials, officially called the Home Hardware Road to the Roar Pre-Trials took place from November 6 to 12 in Summerside, Prince Edward Island. The top two finishers of the men's and women's events qualified to participate in the Trials.

Men's

Teams

Standings
Final round-robin standings

Tiebreakers

Tiebreaker 1
Saturday, November 11, 07:30

Tiebreaker 2
Saturday, November 11, 15:30

Playoffs

A Semifinals
Saturday, November 11, 13:30

A Finals
Sunday, November 12, 9:00

B Quarterfinals
Saturday, November 11, 19:00

Saturday, November 11, 20:30

B Semifinals
Sunday, November 12, 14:00

B Finals
Sunday, November 12, 19:30

Women's

Teams

Standings
Final round-robin standings

Tiebreakers

Tiebreaker 1
Friday, November 10, 23:30

Tiebreaker 2
Saturday, November 11, 07:30

Tiebreaker 3
Saturday, November 11, 12:30

Playoffs

A Semifinals
Saturday, November 11, 13:30

A Finals
Saturday, November 11, 19:00

B Quarterfinals
Saturday, November 11, 19:00

B Semifinals
Sunday, November 12, 9:00

B Finals
Sunday, November 12, 14:00

Qualification process
The qualification process for the 2017 Olympic trials differed slightly from the process used at the 2013 trials. For both the men's and women's categories, a pool of twenty-one teams is designated as eligible to represent Canada at the 2018 Olympics, based on rankings from the Canadian Team Ranking System (CTRS). From the pool of twenty-one, seven teams were selected to qualify directly for the 2017 Canadian Curling Trials in December. The remaining fourteen teams competed in a pre-trials tournament, and the top two teams qualified for the nine-team trials. The winner of each trials will represent Canada at the 2018 Winter Olympics.

Nine teams qualify for the Olympic Trials based on the following criteria. These are the final berths as decided on May 2, 2017

Men

Women

Notes

References

External links
 

2017 in Canadian curling
2017 in Ontario
Curling in Ottawa
Canadian Olympic Curling Trials
Canadian Olympic Curling Trials
Curling at the 2018 Winter Olympics
Qualification tournaments for the 2018 Winter Olympics
2017 in Prince Edward Island
Curling competitions in Prince Edward Island
Sport in Summerside, Prince Edward Island
Canadian Olympic Curling Trials
2010s in Ottawa
Sports competitions in Ottawa